Undertaking may refer to:

 Task (project management), in general
 The services provided by an undertaker, mortician, or a funeral director
 Company, in business, in particular in European Union law, the term is used interchangeably, i.e. a business entity
 Undertaking (driving), overtaking another vehicle using a lane nearer the curb-side
 Undertaking (band), a Hungarian thrash metal band
 Surety bond
 "The Undertaking", an episode of Arrow

See also
 Undertaker (disambiguation)